Metridiochoerus is an extinct genus in the pig family indigenous to the Pliocene and Pleistocene of Africa. It is also known as the giant warthog.

Description
 
Metridiochoerus was a large animal,  in length, resembling a giant warthog. It had two large pairs of tusks which were pointed sideways and curved upwards. Based on the complicated, knobbly pattern of the creature's molars, Metridiochoerus is considered to have been an omnivore.

References

Barry Cox, Colin Harrison, R.J.G. Savage, and Brian Gardiner. (1999): The Simon & Schuster Encyclopedia of Dinosaurs and Prehistoric Creatures: A Visual Who's Who of Prehistoric Life. Simon & Schuster. 
David Norman . (2001): The Big Book Of Dinosaurs. pg. 226, Walcome books. 
World Encyclopedia of Dinosaurs & Prehistoric Creatures: The Ultimate Visual Reference To 1000 Dinosaurs And Prehistoric Creatures Of Land, Air And Sea ... And Cretaceous Eras (World Encyclopedia) by Dougal Dixon

Prehistoric Suidae
Pliocene even-toed ungulates
Pleistocene even-toed ungulates
Piacenzian first appearances
Pleistocene genus extinctions
Cenozoic mammals of Africa
Fossil taxa described in 1926
Pleistocene mammals of Africa
Prehistoric even-toed ungulate genera
Suinae